The Bhutan national under-19/20 football team (also known as BFF Academy) represents Bhutan in men's international under-19/20 football. The team is controlled by the governing body for football in Bhutan, the Bhutan Football Federation, which is currently a member of the Asian Football Federation and the regional body the South Asian Football Federation. They are currently participating in Bhutan Premier League.

History
The Bhutan under-19 football team is one of the youngest u-19 teams in the world, making their competitive debut in 2015 at the 2015 SAFF U-19 Championship. Their debut match was a 3–1 loss to Nepal. Club Brugge youth player Bimal Magar opened the scoring after ten minutes for the hosts, but Bhutan equalised straightaway through defender Sonam Tobgay. They were unable to capitalise on this however as Magar, despite missing a penalty went on to complete his hat trick, scoring after 29 and 62 minutes to seal victory for Nepal. Bhutan manager Nawang Dendup said that the loss was due to his team defending too deep and not being able to match the speed of their opponents.

Current squad
The following squad was selected for the 2016 AFC U-19 Championship qualification matches.

Caps and goals updated as of 6 October 2015, after the match against Sri Lanka.

Recent fixtures and results

Competitive record

SAFF U-20 Championship

*Denotes draws includes knockout matches decided on penalty kicks. Red border indicates that the tournament was hosted on home soil. Gold, silver, bronze backgrounds indicates 1st, 2nd and 3rd finishes respectively. Bold text indicates best finish in tournament.

International opponents
As at 20 August 2015:

References

Asian national under-20 association football teams
Bhutan national under-19 football team